Ffernfael ap Meurig (Modern ; fl. c. 880) was a 9th-century king of Gwent in southeast Wales. He ruled jointly with his brother Brochfael. Asser says in his biography of Alfred the Great that in the 880s: "Brochfael and Ffyrnfael, (sons of Meurig and kings of Gwent), driven by the might and tyrannical behaviour of Ealdorman Æthelred and the Mercians, petitioned King Alfred of their own accord, in order to obtain lordship and protection from him in the face of their enemies".

His name seems to mean "strong ankles", while his brother's meant "strong arm". Their father Meurig ap Arthfael Hen had also been king of Gwent.

See also
 Kings of Gwent

References

Year of birth unknown
Year of death unknown
Monarchs of Gwent
9th-century Welsh monarchs